Paniki is a traditional East Indian (Mostly Odisha) tool with a cutting edge with a wooden footrest. Panikis are used in the kitchen for chopping vegetables, fish and meat. Panikis are mostly found in Odisha, India and the variations of the tool is known as Boti in West Bengal and Tripura in India and in Bangladesh. Various tribes of Odisha used for different purposes. The tribe members of the Mutkia Kondha worship paniki as deity and do not keep their feet with their feet. They rather use a special type of paniki with a wooden stand. Panikis of ancient times show engraving of cultural and religious elements. Traditionally in rural Odisha, panikis are made from wrought iron or recycled steel by the blacksmith.

In popular culture 
In murals of the Ushakothi cave painting at Ulapgarh depict the use of paniki being used by a woman.

References 

Cutting
Odia cuisine
Hand tools